KDI or kdi may refer to:

 Korea Development Institute, a Korean government agency to conduct policy research
 KDI, the DS100 code for Gummersbach-Dieringhausen station, North Rhine-Westphalia, Germany
 KDI, the IATA code for Haluoleo Airport, Kendari, South East Sulawesi, Indonesia
 kdi, the ISO 639-3 code for Kumam dialect, Uganda